Richard Nugent may refer to:

Richard Nugent, 1st Earl of Westmeath (1583–1642), Irish nobleman and politician
Richard Nugent, 2nd Earl of Westmeath (died 1684), Irish nobleman
Richard Nugent, 3rd Earl of Westmeath (died 1714), Irish peer and Roman Catholic monk
Richard Nugent, Lord Delvin (1742–1761), Irish duellist and Member of Parliament 
Richard Nugent (newspaperman) (1815–1858), Canadian newspaperman
Richard E. Nugent (1902–1979), United States Air Force general during World War II
Richard Bruce Nugent (1906–1987), American writer, painter and important figure in the Harlem Renaissance
Richard Nugent, Baron Nugent of Guildford (1907–1994), British politician
Richard Aherne (1911–2002), Irish actor sometimes credited as Richard Nugent
Rich Nugent (born 1951), United States Representative from Florida's 11th Congressional District
Richard Nugent, the bachelor character (played by Cary Grant) in 1947 comedy film The Bachelor and the Bobby-Soxer

See also
Dick Nugent (1931–2018), American golf course designer and architect